In mathematics, the Gompertz constant or Euler–Gompertz constant, denoted by , appears in integral evaluations and as a value of special functions. It is named after Benjamin Gompertz.

It can be defined by the continued fraction

 

or, alternatively, by

 
or
 

 

The first integral defines , and the second and third follow from an integration of parts and a variable substitution respectively.
 

When Euler studied divergent infinite series, he encountered  via, for example, the above integral representations. Le Lionnais called  the Gompertz constant because of its role in survival analysis.

In 2009 Alexander Aptekarev proved that at least one of the Euler–Mascheroni constant and the Euler–Gompertz constant is irrational. This result was improved in 2012 by Tanguy Rivoal where he proved that at least one of them is transcendental.

Identities involving the Gompertz constant

The constant  can be expressed by the exponential integral as

 

Applying the Taylor expansion of  we have the series representation

 

Gompertz's constant is connected to the Gregory coefficients via the 2013 formula of I. Mező:

Notes

External links
Wolfram MathWorld
OEIS entry

Analysis